These are the milestones reached by Japanese football since the creation of J.League.

J.League (J1)

J.League 2 (J2)

J3 League (J3)

References

Historical goal scorers
Association football player non-biographical articles